Paul Dixon may refer to:
Paul Dixon (baseball) (1907–1994), Negro league baseball player
Paul Dixon (entertainer) (1918–1974), American TV show host
Paul Dixon (footballer, born 1960), footballer from Northern Ireland (Burnley, Glentoran)
Paul Dixon (footballer, born 1986), Scottish footballer (Dundee, Dundee United, Huddersfield Town, Scotland)
Paul Dixon (ice hockey) (born 1973), British ice hockey player
Paul Dixon (rugby league) (born 1962), English rugby league footballer
Paul Dixon (musician) (born 1989), British singer-songwriter
Paul Rand Dixon (1913–1996), Chairman and Commissioner of the United States Federal Trade Commission

See also
Paul Dickson (disambiguation)